Chvalšiny is a municipality and village in Český Krumlov District in the South Bohemian Region of the Czech Republic. It has about 1,200 inhabitants. The centre is well preserved and is protected by law as an urban monument zone.

Administrative parts

Villages of Borová, Červený Dvůr and Hejdlov are administrative parts of Chvalšiny.

Geography

Chvalšiny is located in the Bohemian Forest Foothills. Most of the municipal territory lies in the Blanský les Protected Landscape Area. Chvalšinský stream flows through the municipality.

History
The first written mention of Chvalšiny is from 1281, when it was confirmed as property of Zlatá Koruna Monastery. The settlement rapidly developed and already in 1293, it was referred to as a market town. From 1400 to 1785, the religious administration in Chvalšiny was performed by the monastery. During this period, the German settlers came to the area and slowly formed a majority.

During the Hussite Wars, Oldřich II of Rosenberg acquired most of properties of the monastery, including Chvalšiny. Chvalšiny was owned by the Rosenberg family until 1601, when they sold it to Emperor Rudolf II. From 1622, it was owned by the Eggenberg family, and after their extinction, in 1719 it was property of the House of Schwarzenberg, who held it until the abolition of serfdom in 1848.

In 1938, Chvalšiny was annexed to Nazi Germany. After the World War II, the German population was expelled and the area was resettled by Czech citizens.

Sights

The main landmark is the Church of Saint Mary Magdalene. It was built in the late Gothic style in 1487–1507 on the site of an older church.

The former town hall is a Baroque building from 1667. Today it houses the Schwarzenberg Canal Museum and is thus a monument to the architect of the canal Josef Rosenauer, who is a local native.

Červený Dvůr Castle is a Rococo chateau, surrounded by an English park. Today the building serves as a psychiatric hospital.

References

External links

Villages in Český Krumlov District